"The Jezebel Spirit" is the fifth song from the 1981 album My Life in the Bush of Ghosts by David Byrne and Brian Eno. It was released as a single the same year.

Content
The song includes a "found sound"—an exorcism performed by an anonymous exorcist—over Afrobeat music similar to that Byrne and Eno had used in the Talking Heads album Remain in Light. The exorcism was to have been a recording of Kathryn Kuhlman, but her estate prohibited the use of her voice. The phrase "Jezebel spirit" is referencing a woman in the Book of Kings in the Hebrew Bible. Based on stories in that chapter, Jezebel has become associated with prostitution.

Reception

While the album was generally well received by critics, the song attracted negative criticism. Jon Pareles wrote in Rolling Stone magazine that Byrne and Eno had used the exorcism for their own purposes and "trivialized the event".

References

External links
 "The Jezebel Spirit" at discogs.com
 "The Jezebel Spirit" at allmusic.com 

1981 singles
David Byrne songs
Brian Eno songs
Songs written by Brian Eno
Songs written by David Byrne
1981 songs